Changi Hospital is a now-defunct and abandoned general hospital located in Changi, Singapore. Its closure came with the merging with the former Toa Payoh Hospital and was renamed as the Changi General Hospital, which relocated new operations to nearby Simei, not far from Changi. It began winding down activities in February 1997 (completely abandoned in December that year) and remains abandoned to this day but is out of bounds to the public.

History
What is now the abandoned Changi Hospital was first built by the British government in 1935 to complement other military installations like armouries and barracks in Changi, which was then an area with a large British military base that was intended to defend the eastern end (coastal areas) of the Johor Strait. The currently-empty hospital included two main military buildings constructed by the British colonial government, namely Block 24 and Block 37, both on a prominent hill (almost rarely referred to as Barrack Hill (pre-WWII) or FEAF (Far East Air Force) Hill (postwar)) overlooking the eastern Johor Straits and the nearby Pulau Ubin about a kilometre across the sea. Both blocks were a part of Kitchener Barracks, housing the British Army's Royal Engineers, and it is believed that Block 37 was commissioned and used as a small medical facility serving the barracks there. It is also speculated that not only did it serve the engineers barracked there, but artillery soldiers of the Royal Artillery in Roberts Barracks (currently Fairy Point Hotel) and the Gordon Highlanders in Selarang Camp (now the Singapore Army's 9th Division HQ Base), were also provided for at Block 37. These three British military units were based nearby from the hospital in the Changi area.

During the period of the Japanese Occupation of Singapore, the compound of Kitchener Barracks was operated for use as a military hospital (mainly for service to wounded Japanese military personnel and some Allied prisoners-of-war (POWs)) and was also a component of a major prison-area in Changi which was handled by the notorious Kempeitai (the Japanese military police, which also played the role of that of a secret police). Even so, much of the Changi area where Allied and some civilian POWs were held were generally regarded as almost-autonomous in its administration, with prisoners allowed to roam around much of the area, albeit under constant Japanese supervision. In Blocks 24 and 37 of Kitchener Barracks, it is alleged that the Kempeitai also used it as a torture centre (this unfounded rumour was based on the unconfirmed claim that a particular small room with high and narrow windows, in which thick chains hanging on the walls and what was supposedly the remnants of an old torture-device, with alleged bloodstains left on the old floor, served as the infamous torture-chamber in the hospital) aside from its original purpose as a medical centre. The prison's medical facilities at Kitchener Barracks were later deemed inadequate and was temporarily shifted to Roberts Barracks. The medical centre moved back to its original premises at Block 37 following the end of the Second World War in 1945.

Two years later, the British Royal Air Force (RAF), based at the nearby RAF Changi airfield, set up RAF Hospital Changi in Blocks 24 and 37. In 1962, a new building was added to complement the two prewar-era blocks that made up the then-current hospital. Block 161, a large modern addition-structure, was constructed between Blocks 24 and 37 to join them together over FEAF Hill, which prior to that divided the two buildings, making access between them difficult. From 1947 until 1971, the RAF used the hospital to serve not only its service-personnel, but foreign troops from the Commonwealth, not least Australian and New Zealand troops, as well as even UN soldiers during the Korean War too (between 1950 and 1953). This arrangement continued until Singapore claimed full independence in August 1965. From that time on, the British commenced a gradual withdrawal of their military presence from Singapore, following their East of Suez policy, which called for the eventual British departure from Southeast Asia. The hospital was renamed as the ANZUK Hospital in 1971, following the large-scale exit of British troops based in Singapore before that year and served ANZUK (Australia, New Zealand and United Kingdom (UK)) servicemen. The ANZUK unit was disbanded in 1975 and it was renamed the UK Military Hospital, even though British forces were almost no longer present in Singapore anymore (excluding only a very-small token force). In December of that same year, the British finally withdrew the last of their troops and the hospital was handed over to the Singapore Armed Forces (SAF) and renamed as Singapore Armed Forces Hospital. The SAF Hospital catered to medical care of SAF personnel and their immediate families. Gradually, the hospital's services was also extended to members of the public, and rates were charged to the same as other government-run public hospitals elsewhere in Singapore.

The SAF Hospital later merged with the nearby 36-bed Changi Chalet Hospital in 1976 and renamed as Changi Hospital after the former was handed over to the Ministry of Health. This arrangement lasted until 15 December in 1997, when Changi Hospital was shut down after merging with Toa Payoh Hospital to form Changi General Hospital, after which, the old hospital ceased operations and was left empty ever since, with the ownership of the old hospital being transferred to the Singapore Land Authority (SLA) which originally had posted security-guards and their guard-dogs to protect the old hospital from trespassers (at this time, the compound was not fenced up yet and many trespassers, both locals and foreigners, often enter the abandoned premises to conduct activities such as ghost-hunting, vandalism (both graffiti vandalism and outright damaging of the property), consumption of drugs and even Satanic worshipping).

In 2006, the SLA put up the entire site for commercial-based leasing. The tender put up was won by Bestway Properties, which proposed to build a luxurious spa-resort in the old hospital by the first half of 2008. The project fell through and was never commenced (partly due to financial difficulties during the recession at that period of time) and the site was returned to the SLA in 2010, which has since fenced up the entire compound and installed security-cameras and motion-sensors in multiple locations in and around the abandoned hospital to replace the security personnel needed to guard the area (even so, a few, mainly teens and the general youth, still attempt to sneak inside the hospital despite the risk of being arrested). Prosegur is the security company charged by SLA to protect Changi Hospital, which continues to remain abandoned to this day.

Universal Studios Singapore (USS) has built a small replica of the ex-Changi Hospital in its theme-park to raise awareness of the famous haunted building, which becomes popular amongst visitors especially during the Halloween period. Since its abandonment, many horror stories and paranormal tales have emerged from the place, ranging from tales of an alleged nurse roaming the compound to poltergeists haunting the old hospital. However, there is almost no substantial proof to back these up, aside from several photos or videos taken outside or within the abandoned hospital.

On 3 November 2021, there is a proposal to transform the Old Changi Hospital into a stargazing observatory and aviation viewing deck has won a competition aimed at revamping the Changi Point area. It was named Ascending to the Sky and placed first in the open category in a contest for ideas to repurpose the old hospital. The competition was organised by the Singapore Land Authority (SLA) and Urban Redevelopment Authority (URA).

Hauntings
The vacated hospital compound was popular with film-makers after the Singapore Land Authority commenced a short-term rental programme of the abandoned and derelict buildings that was once Changi Hospital. Many popular MediaCorp television series such as Growing Up, The Crime Hunters, C.I.D. and Incredible Tales were partly filmed at the now-abandoned hospital, which by the 2000s was already badly damaged and entirely desecrated by hundreds of vandals, criminals, drug-users and possible Satanists. Around this time, Old Changi Hospital, as it is popularly known, was famously declared by many Singaporeans, young and old alike, to be one of the most haunted locations in the whole country. The buildings are said to be haunted by the souls of the victims of the Japanese Occupation, homeless ghosts and the spirits of those who died in the hospital. In 2017, a video of sightings of a nurse carrying a baby in the haunted hospital circulated around the Internet, sparking debate on its authenticity and the spookiness of the former hospital and the supposed paranormal activities inside. Until now, the authenticity of this video has not yet been proven. The once-abandoned and derelict buildings and its ghostly reputation were the basis for the 2010 mockumentary Haunted Changi, which, using found-footage, told of a small group of paranormal investigators going inside the hospital to learn of its horrifying past and ended with terrifying outcomes to each member. Some of the more prominent areas of the old hospital that was famous for hauntings include the old mortuary which has since been demolished, the tile-walled operating theatre and the old hospital's Accident-and-Emergency (A&E) building (located below the hill from where the main hospital is located at has long been demolished already). There is also a widespread belief of the presence of supposed underground bunkers beneath Changi Hospital (from the days when it was a military base), although there is currently no available access to them and their alleged entry-points (rumoured to be 3) are also closed off. A picture had been taken at Changi Aloha Chalet near the hospital and allegedly showed what was seen as a ghost. According to the owners of the photo, their room was located right opposite Changi Hospital and the abandoned (and infamously-haunted) Aloha Changi Resort.

References

Abandoned buildings and structures
Hospital buildings completed in 1935
British military hospitals
Hospitals established in 1935
Hospitals disestablished in 1997
Defunct hospitals in Singapore
Reportedly haunted locations
20th-century architecture in Singapore